Frida Ghitis is a world affairs columnist and analyst.

Frida Ghitis is a world affairs columnist. She is a CNN contributor and writes a weekly column at CNN Opinion, is a contributing columnist for the Washington Post Global Opinions, and a weekly columnist at World Politics Review.

A former CNN producer and correspondent, Ghitis is a frequent on-air commentator on CNN, CNN International and CNN Español as well as other radio and television networks around the world.

During her years on staff at CNN she was part of the award-winning teams that covered global events including the unraveling of the former Yugoslavia, the US intervention in Haiti, the collapse of the USSR, the Iraqi invasion of Kuwait and subsequent US intervention via Saudi Arabia. She has worked in more than 60 countries. She has reported from Iraq, Bosnia, Burma, Tibet, the Amazon jungle, Gaza, Cuba, and countless other locations.
 
She worked for 18 years in various capacities for CNN and used that experience to write The End of Revolution: A Changing World in the Age of Live Television (2002). Ghitis' writing has appeared in newspapers, magazines and websites worldwide, including The Atlantic, Politico, the Chicago Tribune, The Philadelphia Inquirer, the International Herald Tribune,  the NRC Handelsblad (Netherlands) and many others.

Ghitis has a BA in Economics from Emory University and a MA in Political Science from the University of Northern British Columbia.

References 

American columnists
American women columnists
CNN people
20th-century American journalists
20th-century American women writers
21st-century American journalists
21st-century American women writers